Derryarrit is small a townland in the north of County Monaghan in Ireland.

References

Townlands of County Monaghan